Gangavalli is a state assembly constituency in Tamil Nadu, India, that was formed after constituency delimitations in 2007. Its State Assembly Constituency number is 81. Located in Salem district, it comprises Gangavalli taluk and a portion of Attur taluk. It is a part of the Kallakurichi constituency for national elections to the Parliament of India. The seat is reserved for candidates from the Scheduled Castes. It is one of the 234 State Legislative Assembly Constituencies in Tamil Nadu in India.

A. Nallathambi is the MLA from ADMK party elected in 2021.

Composition
Gangavalli is an assembly constituency in the Salem District of Tamil Nadu State, which includes Gangavalli Taluk and a part of Attur Taluk.
Thammampatti, Sentharapatti , Naduvalur, Unathur, Veppanatham, Varagur, Siruvachur, Maniviluthan, Kattukkottai, Sadasivapuram, Sarvoy, Deviakkurichi, Talaivasal, Pattuthurai, Navakkurchi, Puthur, Nathakkarai, Periyeri, Aragalur, Thiyaganur, Arathi Agraharam, Mummudi, Kamakkapalayam, Vadakumarai, Thenkumarai, Sathapadi, Panavasal, Navalur, Puliyankurichi, Sitheri, Govindampalayam and Pallipalayam, Anayampatti, Anayampatti Puthur, Thedavoor, Odiyathur and other villages.

Members of the Legislative Assembly

Election Results

2021

2016

2011

References 

Assembly constituencies of Tamil Nadu
Salem district